Kuo Shu-yao (born 18 July 1990), nicknamed Yao Yao, is a Taiwanese actress, singer, television host and entrepreneur. In 2013 she won the Golden Horse Award for Best New Performer for her role in Step Back to Glory.

In 2021, Kuo established the fashion brand Myâme.

Life and career
In May 2007, Kuo's father died and she began working part-time at a restaurant to support her family. Two years later, in 2009, she entered show business as a model. After signing with Seed Music in 2007, she debuted as a singer and released a mini album titled Love Hug on 22 August 2007.

In 2017, she played the titular character in the supernatural coming-of-age drama The Teenage Psychic. The 6-episode series is an adaptation of the short film The Busy Young Psychic by writer-director Chen Ho-yu.  The Teenage Psychic is also HBO Asia's first Mandarin-language original series.

Filmography

Television series

Film

Variety and reality shows

Music video appearances

Discography

Studio albums

Live albums

Extended plays

Singles

Published works

Awards and nominations

References

External links

 
 
 
 Kuo Shu-yao Weibo

1990 births
Living people
21st-century Taiwanese actresses
Participants in Chinese reality television series
Taiwanese film actresses
Taiwanese television actresses
21st-century Taiwanese singers
Taiwanese Mandopop singers
Taiwanese television presenters
Actresses from Taipei
21st-century Taiwanese women singers
Taiwanese women television presenters